Head on to Heartache is an EP by American heavy metal band DevilDriver. It contains five songs, four of which were previously only available on special editions of their albums, or on soundtracks of movies, and one song from 2007's The Last Kind Words.

Track list

Sources
http://mmfore.blogspot.com/2008/04/devildriver-head-on-to-heartache-ep.html
http://www.roadrunnerrecords.co.uk/page/News?&news_page=&news_id=55131

DevilDriver albums
2007 EPs
Roadrunner Records EPs